A City Under Siege: Tales of the Iran–Iraq War (2000) is a collection of nine stories from the Iran–Iraq War by Habib Ahmadzadeh, an Iranian author. The book won awards in Iran and was called one of the top twenty books about the Iran–Iraq War. The book was originally published in 2000 by Sureye Mehr Publication in Persian. Paul Sprachman, professor of Rutgers University translated the book from Persian into English and Mazda Publishers published it in 2010.

Author

Ahmadzadeh was born in Abadan in 1964. He received his MA of Dramatic Literature from Tehran University of Art. Ahmadzadeh contributed to writing scripts including The Glass Agency, An Umbrella for the Director, and The Rig, among others. His first work was Chess with the Doomsday Machine.

Reception
Writing in complete review, M.A. Orthofer said:
"Ahmadzadeh tries to make connection with the reader in A City Under Siege. Most stories are told in the first person. A City Under Siege is a solid collection of wartime stories. Ahmadzadeh relies heavily on certain tricks and has a few authorial tics, but he's a talented writer and these are effective, good stories. This collection is certainly a good introduction to frontline Iranian life during this conflict (with which most Western readers will presumably not yet be very familiar."

The book was reviewed in Middle East Studies Association of North America's Review of Middle East Studies by Hamid Eshani.

Awards and honors
Habib Ahmadzadeh received the third prize of the Writing Forge Short Story Competition for his "Letter to the Sa'ad Family", published in A City Under Siege.

Contents
A City under Siege consists of these novelettes:
 "Eagle Feather"
 "The Airplane"
 "An Umbrella for the Director"
 "Thirty-nine Plus One Prisoners"
 "The Fleeing of the Warrior"
 "A Letter to the Saad Family"
 "If There Were No Darya Qoli"
 "Vengeance"
 "Neneh"

See also
 Chess with the Doomsday Machine
 Persepolis (banned in Iran)

References

Iran–Iraq War memoirs
2000 non-fiction books
Persian-language novels
Iranian short story collections
Iranian memoirs
2000 short story collections